, known professionally as , is a Japanese actress. She began her career as a member of the Takarazuka Revue. She was nominated for Best Supporting Actress at the 32nd Japan Academy Prize for Kabei: Our Mother.

Filmography

Dramas

Film
 Love and Honor (2006)
 Kabei: Our Mother (2008)
 Snow Prince (2009)
 Ninja Kids!!! (2011)
 Gyakuten Saiban (2012)
 Ask This of Rikyu (2013), Kita no mandokoro
 Your Lie in April (2016)
 Laplace's Witch (2018)
 Marmalade Boy (2018)
 Kasane: Beauty and Fate (2018), Sukeyo Fuchi
 Caution, Hazardous Wife: The Movie (2021)
 Sun and Bolero (2022)
 Silent Parade (2022)

Dubbing
 The Three Musketeers (2011), Milady de Winter (Milla Jovovich)

References

1971 births
Actors from Hyōgo Prefecture
Japanese film actresses
Japanese television actresses
Living people
20th-century Japanese actresses
21st-century Japanese actresses
Takarazuka Revue